The Institute for Indian Mother and Child (IIMC) is a 
non-governmental organization with its main office in Calcutta,  
India. In 1989.  The Indian physician Dr. S. K. Brahmochary founded  
the IIMC with the aim to improve the living conditions of the poor population  
in Calcutta and its surroundings on a long-term basis. The issues of  
mother and child welfare as well as woman empowerment are of North eastern India was its priority.

Main activities 
1. Medical program
 1 pediatric indoor clinic equipped with 20 beds
 5 outdoor clinics
 health counseling and education for 50,000 women
 cooperation with 40 other NGOs

2. Education program
 financial support for 3,000 students
 28 schools for more than 7,000 students were built by the IIMC

3. Economic program
 microloans for more than 24,000 women
 Rural Development Program
 women's training and professional development
 housing for homeless
 effluent disposal

Beginnings 
The Institute for Indian Mother and Child (IIMC) is a non-governmental  
organization (NGO).  The IIMC project was initiated in 1989 by Dr. S.  
K. Brahmochary with the aim to provide the poorest people in Parganas,  
the 24th district in the South of Calcutta, with access to medical  
care. In the meantime, the project has expanded so that apart from 
medical services also education, health counseling, sponsorships,  
rural development projects and microloans can be offered.

Goals and mission 
The IIMC seeks to improve the living conditions of the poor and  
disadvantaged people. The main goals are to ensure medical care for  
mothers and their children, to make education accessible, to promote  
economic development and to strengthen peace and solidarity within  
society.

One man's vision 
IIMC founder Sujit Kumar Barhmochary finished his medical studies in  
Calcutta and specialized in pediatrics in Belgium thanks to a scholarship granted by the  
Belgian Red Cross. After his medical training he realized that doctors  
like him were actually needed in India and that he wanted to dedicate  
his career to the improvement of the living conditions of the poor. So  
he returned to Calcutta and became Mother Teresa's medical director.  
Both Mother Teresa and her spiritual director Fr. Celest Van Exem  
influenced him notably.
 
After he had been working for Mother Teresa for two years, Dr. Sujit  
decided to start his own project. In 1989, he realized this plan 30  
kilometers South from Calcutta in a neighborhood, where people had  
neither access to medical care nor to education. The first medical  
facility was an outdoor clinic in Tegharia: a simple bamboo hut, where  
20 children were treated a day. At first the project only focused on  
medical care. Later it gradually developed into a place of refuge for  
all the poor people in the area, who were not only in need for medical  
care, but also for access to education as well as economic and social  
support.

Project sites in Calcutta 
The Tegharia Indoor Clinic that is located in Sonarput 30 kilometers  
southeast from Calcutta represents the IIMC's main office. The  
clinic's pediatric unit is equipped with 20 beds; the mother's unit  
offers 20 beds. Moreover, Tegharia holds an education center, the 
women's cooperative unit as well as the mother's Bank and Micro  
finance unit. Apart from Sonarpur, the IIMC is currently also  
operating in the following districts:

Medical program 
In the beginning Dr. Brahmochary was the project's only physician.  
Today there are 18 doctors and 141 helath workers working with him so that nowadays, locals 
do not only have access to out-patient and in-patient care, but also  
to vaccinations, X-ray, ultrasound, dental treatment, ophthalmic  
treatment and pathological examination. The IIMC is currently 
providing medical services for 120,000 patients from the entire  
district and its surroundings. The following table summarizes the  
daily out-patient admissions:

Education and sponsorship program 
During the first three years of his work Dr. Brahmochary realized that a lack of knowledge causes most medical problems. He also observed that many people repeatedly returned with the same troubles, even though this could be avoided by dint of education and health counseling. The illiteracy rate in India is 46%, the poverty rate more than 60%. 30% are currently living below the WHO poverty line. 80% do not have access to medical care. In order to solve this problem at least on a local level, the so-called Sponsorship Program has been initiated. The aim is to send at least one child of a poor family to school so that they learn how to read and write and will later be able to support their families. The program started in 1994 with 10 children. In the course of only 15 years the number of sponsorships has increased to 2,500. The children are currently supported by sponsoring parents from Australia, Austria, Belgium, Canada, Denmark, England, Finland, Germany, Italy, Japan, the Netherlands, Norway, Slovenia, Spain, Sweden and the USA. Due to the monthly contribution of 20 Euros tuition fees, school things, school uniforms, shoes, winter clothes, lunch and tutor lessons can be 
financed. Sponsoring parents get information about the family's living conditions and a photograph. Twice a year they learn about the current development of the child and they receive a school report. In the course of the project  "Umbrella of Spread Up Education" 22 schools have been built in the surrounding villages. Due to these facilities, the IIMC hopes to make education accessible for as many children as possible. The aim is to build two new schools a year.

Health program 
The health program aims at a better understanding of health issues and  
hygiene in the broad public, since informed people can solve many  
health problems on their own. Traditional Indian medicine and its 
understanding of health is often based on myths and there are some 
practices that are harmful rather than helpful. This is why the IIMC 
tries to resolve these superstitions by informing people and doing 
away with taboos. The Women's Peace Council contributes a lot to this,  
due to its lessons about health issues and hygiene.
 
Education for mothers
Currently the health program offers two courses that do not only treat  
issues concerning  health and hygiene as mentioned above, but also  
nutrition, family problems, family planning and female health  
problems. Also controversial topics like discrimination against women,  
inferiority of girls and women's rights are discussed.
 
Network program
Due to the network program the IIMC seeks to expand its health program 
in order to reach even the most remote villages in West Bengal so that 
lessons, workshops, seminars and symposia can be organized more 
easily. At the moment the IIMC is cooperating with 40 other NGOs in 8 
different districts of Bengal.

Woman empowerment 
This main goal of this project is capacity building. Even today women have only very few rights in the Indian society. Injustice, violation of human rights and exploitation still prevail in the everyday reality  
of Indian women. They have been systematically oppressed for 
centuries. This is why the IIMC has made the promotion of emancipation 
one of its key issues. The following activities are meant to support this ambition:

 building self-confidence
 girls’ education
 microcredit program
 professional training and development
 legal consultation
 psychological consultation

Women’s economic independence
This project has two subcategories:
 Matree Udyog (Program for the mothers of godchildren)
 Mahila Udyog (Program for women from poor rural villages)

 
The IIMC s convinced that even in the poorest person there is some potential. If you reveal and nurture this potential, this person is likely to become financially and economically independent. Since women in rural areas have neither money nor the courage to ask conventional banks for loans or a bank account, the IIMC supports these women with microloans. Today there are 3,000 women involved in the project.

Mahila Udyog 
This program started in 1999. It is similar to the idea of the Grameen  
Bank of Bangladesh, where women can deposit money and take up a loan  
of 10,000 Rupees (about $210 ). The aim is to make women economically independent. The credits shall help them to expand their businesses like sewing rooms, weaving mills, laundries, etc. At the moment there are 24,000 women from 243 villages involved in the project; a loan of 40 million Rupees (about $842,000 ) is currently at disposal. The pay back rate comprises 98%. Economical independence represents one major step on the way towards emancipation. The IIMC has opened up a weaving mill, a sewing room, dyeworks and a laundry. In these facilities, school bags and school uniforms are produced as well as everyday clothing.

Girls' education 
Education for girls has always been central issue to the IIMC. If girls obtain education, this is not only an advantage for them, but also for their future family and children. This is why the IIMC is especially interested in finding international sponsoring parents for girls.

 
Education for everyone is the developments.
 
- Swami Vivekananda -

 see also: Vivekananda

Women’s professional training and development 
This project involves:
 sewing courses
 weaving courses
 knitting courses
 production of school bags and school uniforms
 running a small shop
39 women are currently working for this project.

Women Peace Council 
The aim of this project is to involve women in decisions that concern village communities and to make for a more peaceful atmosphere. The council meets every day for two hours in order to discuss local problems. The women also visit troubled families and cooperate with local inhabitants to find solutions. The project also helps to build up the self-confidence of these women.

Day-care center and disabled people’s home
The IIMC has by now been working in the field of health, education and development for 14 years. There are many women who are working in factories or on the field all day. Most of them have no education, do simple work and are not aware of the importance of education for their own children. This is why many children become victims of child labor and exploitation. They start working at the age of five instead of going to school. In order to fight this problem, the IIMC has initiated a day-care center, where working mothers can bring their children for free. Also disabled children are especially disadvantaged in the Indian society and are often repudiated by their families. The IIMC's disabled people's home admits these children.

Dhaki outdoor clinic 
Dhaki lies 11 kilometers South from Calcutta. Also here the IIMC has built up a network providing basic medical care, microloans and education. Before this initiative, the next medical center was 30 kilometers away and most people could not afford to see a doctor. Pregnant women could not afford medical precaution or supervised childbirth and delivered at home in their huts. The children suffered from malnutrition, verminous diseases and skin infections. In 2003 the IIMC expanded its mission to the Dhaki area, founded the Women's Health Center in 2006 and financed an ambulance boat.

Rural Development Project 
There are the following the sub-projects:
 
Dukherpole Project
This program was the IIMC's first rural development project. It includes the cultivation of farm land bought by the IIMC, the provision of water for poor families of farmers and the expansion of  the fish farms in water pools that were built by the IIMC.
 
Purjata Project
80% of the people in the area lives off farming and 10% of fish farming. More than 60% are living below the poverty line. The project includes the cultivation of farm land bought by the IIMC, the  
provision of water for poor farmer families, the expansion of the fish farms in water pools that were built by the IIMC.
 
Dhaki Project
Also this project aims at a more efficient cultivation of farmland.

Financing 
The IIMC is financed by the donations of private persons from all over the world. However, the IIMC tries to raise money through the production of mozzarella cheese as well as its weaving room, sewing room, laundry and dyeworks.

Milk and mozzarella production 
The IIMC's director Dr. Brahmochary once discussed the production of mozzarella cheese with an Italian business woman in West Bengal. Their idea should finally be realized. The business woman called Annamaria sent technicians and trainers from Rome, who instructed two young men that were working for the IIMC. Today the cheese production is part of the microcredit system. More than 100 women, who own a cow, sell milk to the IIMC every day for fair and fixed prices. The women receive 18 Rupees (about $0.38 ) even though the market price would only be 15 to 16 Rupees. The IIMC then produces mozzarella and sells it to restaurants. For comparison: 10 liters of milk make 1 kilogram of  mozzarella.

Cow-Project 
The Cow and the goat project started in 2013. One animal is donated to a woman in need. She can independently dispose about the milk of this animal. An involvement into the diary of IIMC is possible. The first female calf needs to be given back to IIMC. Currently 37 cows and 3 goats have been donated.

Administration 
More than 550 volunteers do not only invest their manpower, but also their enthusiasm in the project. Even though they do not get paid, they are pleased to participate. Volunteers work in schools, the day-are center, the weaving room, the sewing room, the laundry or the dyeworks.

Grameen Mother Bank 
Microcredits and microsavings are essential to the economical development of poor people. Everybody who wants to build up a business or service needs seed capital. Usually poor people take out only small loans and try to make as much of it as possible. Conventional banks however tend to exploit people and are primarily interested in the repayment of the loans. This practice has already ruined many entrepreneurs, who had to sell their land and modest possessions and were finally even poorer than before. The winner of the Nobel Peace Prize Muhammad Yunus saw this problem and founded the Grameen Bank, which considers both the financial and social dimension of a loan.  
Here, it is not necessary to prove one's financial security before receiving a loan, because the money is given to a group of women, who control each other to make sure that the sum will be paid back indeed. It is mandatory to pay back the full amount of the loan. At the moment the pay back rates comprise 98%. The IIMC successfully has taken over this idea.

Legal status 
The project is officially registered:
- Registered under Public Trust Act.
- Registered under Foreign Contribution Regulation Act.
- Registered under Section 80-G of Income Tax Act.
- Registered under 12-A of Income Tax Act.

External links 
 Internationale IIMC Homepage (English)
 Deutsche Homepage des Vereins zur Unterstützung des IIMC e.V.
 https://www.realmadrid.com/en/news/2017/10/the-foundation-and-the-institute-for-indian-mother-and-child-in-calcutta-renew-their-partnership-agreement
 https://register-of-charities.charitycommission.gov.uk/charity-details/?regid=1066834&subid=0
 Official IIMC website 
 German IIMC website 

Medical and health organisations based in India
Organizations established in 1989
Organisations based in Kolkata
1989 establishments in West Bengal